Read Township may refer to one of the following places within the United States:

 Read Township, Clayton County, Iowa
 Read Township, Butler County, Nebraska

Township name disambiguation pages